The  is an arcade system board developed by Capcom that ran game software stored on removable daughterboards. More than two dozen arcade titles were released for CPS-1, before Capcom shifted game development over to its successor, the CP System II.

Among the 33 titles released for the original CP System include Street Fighter II: The World Warrior and its first two follow-ups, Street Fighter II: Champion Edition and Street Fighter II: Hyper Fighting.

History

After a number of arcade game boards designed to run only one game, Capcom embarked upon a project to produce a system board that could be used to run multiple games, in order to reduce hardware costs and make the system more appealing to arcade operators.

Capcom began developing the CPS hardware around 1986, when Capcom president Kenzo Tsujimoto came up with the concept inspired by the success of the Nintendo Entertainment System (NES). He saw the rise of home video games as competition for the arcades, so said the "only way we can make money is to give people twice what they can get at home."

Capcom developed the CPS hardware for about two-and-a-half years, during which time they developed two custom microchips that they called the CPS Super Chips, equivalent to the power of ten normal arcade printed circuit boards (PCBs) at the time.

The system was plagued by many bootleg versions of its games. In particular, there were so many bootleg versions of Street Fighter II that they were more common in some countries than the official version. This problem was virtually eliminated by Capcom in the later CP System II.

The CP System hardware was also utilized in Capcom's unsuccessful attempt at home console market penetration, the CPS Changer, a domestic version of the CP System similar to the Neo-Geo AES.

Technical specifications
CPU:
Primary: Motorola 68000 @ 10 MHz (some later boards 12 MHz)
Secondary: Zilog Z80 @ 3.579 MHz
Co-processors: 2x CPS Super Chip
Sound chips:
Yamaha YM2151 @ 3.579 MHz
Oki OKI6295 @ 1 MHz (7.576 kHz samples)
Display
Resolution: Raster, 384×224 @ 59.6294 Hz
Color depth: 16-bit (12-bit RGB with 4-bit brightness value)
Colors available: 65,536
Onscreen colors: 4096 (192 global palettes with 16 colors each)
Sprites:
Simultaneously displayable: 256 (per scanlines)
Sizes: 16×16, max. 16 colors (15 unique + 1 transparent)
Vertical and horizontal flipping capability
Tiles: Sizes 8×8, 16×16, 32×32 with 16 colors (15 unique + 1 transparent)
Tile maps: 3 maps, 512×512, 1024×1024, 2048×2048 pixel
68K RAM: 64 KB WORK RAM + 192 KB VRAM (Shadow)
PPU: 192 KB VRAM + 16 KB CACHE RAM
Z80 RAM: 2 KB WORK RAM

List of games

CP System Dash

A year before releasing the CP System II, Capcom released an enhanced version of the original CP System dubbed the CP System Dash, which had some features that would later be used in the CP System II, such as the QSound chips.

The CP System Dash boards have four interlocking PCBs and are contained in gray plastic boxes. To combat piracy, "suicide batteries" were implemented, which power the volatile RAM which contained the manual configuration of the display hardware registers, as well as the priorities registers. The CPS-1 Dash 68000 code is not encrypted at all. If the batteries' voltage should drop below +2V, the registers manually defined in factory by Capcom in RAM would be lost, and the PPU would no longer have access to the hardware specific register set on the game used, rendering the game inoperable, and necessitating the operator sending the board to Capcom to be fixed, at their own expense. Unlike the CP System II, CP System Dash sound ROMs were encrypted using "Kabuki" Z80s.

List of games

Capcom Power System Changer

A home version of the CP System, the Capcom Power System Changer or CPS Changer was released in late 1994 in Japan to compete against SNK's Neo Geo. Capcom released the CPS Changer as an attempt to sell their arcade games in a home-friendly format. The CPS Changer adapter was basically an encased SuperGun (Television JAMMA adapter), and was compatible with most JAMMA standard PCBs. Capcom's "protection" against people using the CPS Changer on other arcade boards was the physical shape of the device. On a normal JAMMA PCB it would not attach firmly and tended to lean at odd angles, but it would work. The CPS Changer has outputs for composite video, S-video and line-level mono audio.

Upon launch in November 1994, Capcom initially manufactured only 1,000 units in Japan.

The CPS Changer featured Super Famicom controller ports, allowing the use of all Super NES controllers, including their six-button joystick, the "CPS Fighter".

All of the CPS Changer games used the CPS arcade hardware. The CPS Changer games were simply arcade PCBs in a special plastic shell suitable for home use. This concept was later re-used in the CP System II hardware. Some CPS1 games were changed slightly for home release, sometimes including debugging features or other easter eggs.

The CPS Changer was sold as a package deal of the console itself, one CPS Fighter joystick controller, and the Street Fighter II ′ (Dash) Turbo game for 39,800 yen. Additional games were sold for about 20,000 yen.

The final game for the CPS Changer was a back-ported version of Street Fighter Zero. Originally released on the CP System II hardware, this special CPS Changer version, released at a premium 35,000 yen, was degraded slightly for the older hardware: it had fewer frames of animation for the game characters, fewer onscreen colors, and the sound and music effects were sampled at a lower rate.

List of games

See also
 CP System II
 CP System III

References

External links
 CPS-1 at System 16 - The Arcade Museum
 GameSX Power Stick Analysis — looking at the features and functions of the A10CA stick
 CPS-1, CPS-2 and CPS-3 releases comparison at UVL
  Full list of CP System ROMs

Capcom arcade system boards
Fourth-generation video game consoles
Computer-related introductions in 1988
68k-based arcade system boards